Benholm is a small settlement in Aberdeenshire, Scotland, UK. It is now a conservation area and is home to Benholm Mill.

The A92 passes the eastern edge of Benholm. The settlement was served by Birnie Road Halt railway station from 1865 to 1951.

History
Evidence of a Kirk existing here dates back to 1242 and a history of milling dating back to the 12th century. The kirk was rebuilt in 1832. The area was designated as a conservation area in 2006.

References

Villages in Aberdeenshire